Emmi Silvennoinen (born 9 April 1988) is a Finnish keyboardist who is the former keyboardist for the folk metal band Ensiferum. She filled the role following the departure of Meiju Enho from Ensiferum in September 2007 before joining it as a member during the recording of the album From Afar (2009). Emmi was also the keyboard player for the melodic death/gothic metal band Exsecratus.

References

Finnish heavy metal keyboardists
1988 births
Living people
Ensiferum members